Promontory Point is a ghost town in Box Elder County, Utah, United States, that is located about  northeast of the cape with the same name.

Description
The site is where the Lucin Cutoff intersects the east coast of the peninsula formed where the Promontory Mountains project into the northern Great Salt Lake.

The unincorporated community of Promontory and its location, Promontory Summit, are also frequently referred to as "Promontory Point".

See also

 List of ghost towns in Utah

References

External links

Ghost towns in Utah
Populated places in Box Elder County, Utah